Walkom is a surname. Notable people with the surname include:

Arthur Bache Walkom (1889–1976), Australian palaeobotanist and museum director
Stephen Walkom (born 1963), Canadian ice hockey referee
Thomas Walkom (born 1950), Canadian journalist